The 1911 Volta a Catalunya was the inaugural edition of the Volta a Catalunya cycle race and was held from 6 January to 8 January 1911. The race started and finished in Barcelona. The race was won by Sebastián Masdeu.

Starting cyclists
Of the 33 starting cyclists, 22 finished. The winner, Sebastián Masdeu, received 500 pesetas for his victory.

Route and stages

General classification

{|
|Final general classification

References

1911
Volta
1911 in Spanish road cycling
January 1911 sports events